Sŏgam station is a railway station in Taegam-ri, Sunan-guyŏk, P'yŏngyang, North Korea. It is located on the P'yŏngŭi line of the Korean State Railway.

History
The station, originally called T'aegam station, was opened by the Chosen Government Railway on 1 July 1923.

References

Railway stations in North Korea
Buildings and structures in Pyongyang
Railway stations opened in 1923
1923 establishments in Korea